Danville is an unincorporated community and census-designated place (CDP) in Allegany County, Maryland, United States. As of the 2010 census it had a population of 271.

The community lies in a valley bounded by  Dans Mountain to the northwest and  Fort Hill to the southeast.

Demographics

References

Census-designated places in Allegany County, Maryland
Census-designated places in Maryland